TIES may refer to:

 TIES, Teacher Institute for Evolutionary Science 
 TIES, The Interactive Encyclopedia System
 TIES, Time Independent Escape Sequence
 Theoretical Issues in Ergonomics Science
 The International Ecotourism Society

de:TIE
eo:TIE
it:TIE